Camariñas is a municipality in the province of A Coruña in the autonomous community of Galicia in northwestern Spain. It belongs to the comarca of Terra de Soneira. An important fishing center, it is renowned all over Spain by the bobbin lace work of its women (the palilleiras).

To the northwest are the impressive cliffs of Cape Vilan (Cabo Vilán "Cape Villain", due to bad currents and many wrecks), a protected natural site.

Demography

References

Municipalities in the Province of A Coruña
Populated coastal places in Spain